The Asia/Oceania Zone was one of the three zones of the regional Davis Cup competition in 1999.

In the Asia/Oceania Zone there were four different tiers, called groups, in which teams competed against each other to advance to the upper tier. The top two teams in Group III advanced to the Asia/Oceania Zone Group II in 2000, whereas the bottom two teams were relegated to the Asia/Oceania Zone Group IV in 2000.

Participating nations

Draw
 Venue: National Centre, Dhaka, Bangladesh
 Date: 10–14 March

Group A

Group B

1st to 4th place play-offs

5th to 8th place play-offs

Final standings

  and  promoted to Group II in 2000.
  and  relegated to Group IV in 2000.

Round robin

Group A

Bangladesh vs. Syria

Hong Kong vs. Malaysia

Bangladesh vs. Malaysia

Hong Kong vs. Syria

Bangladesh vs. Hong Kong

Malaysia vs. Syria

Group B

Bahrain vs. Saudi Arabia

Saudi Arabia vs. Pacific Oceania

Bahrain vs. Pacific Oceania

Pacific Oceania vs. Tajikistan

Bahrain vs. Tajikistan

Saudi Arabia vs. Tajikistan

1st to 4th place play-offs

Semifinals

Malaysia vs. Pacific Oceania

Hong Kong vs. Tajikistan

Final

Malaysia vs. Hong Kong

3rd to 4th play-off

Pacific Oceania vs. Tajikistan

5th to 8th place play-offs

5th to 8th play-offs

Bangladesh vs. Bahrain

Syria vs. Saudi Arabia

5th to 6th play-off

Bangladesh vs. Syria

7th to 8th play-off

Bahrain vs. Saudi Arabia

References

External links
Davis Cup official website

Davis Cup Asia/Oceania Zone
Asia Oceania Zone Group III